Donald Joseph Shanks (3 October 1922 – 4 October 1978) was a Bermudian swimmer. He competed in the men's 100 metre backstroke at the 1948 Summer Olympics.

Personal life
Shanks served in the Bermuda Volunteer Engineers and the Royal Air Force as a wireless operator during the Second World War. He was awarded the Defence Medal for his service. Shanks died of cancer in 1978.

References

1922 births
1978 deaths
Bermudian male swimmers
Olympic swimmers of Bermuda
Swimmers at the 1948 Summer Olympics
People from Pembroke Parish
Male backstroke swimmers
Royal Air Force personnel of World War II
Royal Air Force airmen
Deaths from cancer in Bermuda